The Kingisepp single-member constituency (No. 112) is a Russian legislative constituency in Leningrad Oblast. In its current configuration the constituency is located in Western Leningrad Oblast, anchoring in the city of Kingisepp.

Members elected

By-election are shown in italics.

Election results

1995

|-
! colspan=2 style="background-color:#E9E9E9;text-align:left;vertical-align:top;" |Candidate
! style="background-color:#E9E9E9;text-align:left;vertical-align:top;" |Party
! style="background-color:#E9E9E9;text-align:right;" |Votes
! style="background-color:#E9E9E9;text-align:right;" |%
|-
|style="background-color:"|
|align=left|Viktor Vorogushin
|align=left|Independent
|
|13.12%
|-
|style="background-color:#DA2021"|
|align=left|Valery Kirpichnikov
|align=left|Ivan Rybkin Bloc
|
|11.74%
|-
|style="background-color:"|
|align=left|Vadim Gustov
|align=left|Independent
|
|11.00%
|-
|style="background-color:"|
|align=left|Rashid Ismagilov
|align=left|Our Home – Russia
|
|9.91%
|-
|style="background-color:"|
|align=left|Aleksandr Astakhov
|align=left|Independent
|
|7.13%
|-
|style="background-color:#D50000"|
|align=left|Aleksandr Stavitsky
|align=left|Communists and Working Russia - for the Soviet Union
|
|6.73%
|-
|style="background-color:"|
|align=left|Sergey Semenov
|align=left|Yabloko
|
|5.92%
|-
|style="background-color:#1C1A0D"|
|align=left|Igor Yudchenko
|align=left|Forward, Russia!
|
|5.34%
|-
|style="background-color:"|
|align=left|Yevgeny Buzov
|align=left|Liberal Democratic Party
|
|4.84%
|-
|style="background-color:"|
|align=left|Vladimir Leonov
|align=left|Independent
|
|4.17%
|-
|style="background-color:#324194"|
|align=left|Aleksandr Khudulainen
|align=left|Union of Workers of ZhKKh
|
|2.53%
|-
|style="background-color:#F21A29"|
|align=left|Stepan Kolomeytsev
|align=left|Trade Unions and Industrialists – Union of Labour
|
|1.57%
|-
|style="background-color:"|
|align=left|Vladimir Michurin
|align=left|Independent
|
|0.36%
|-
|style="background-color:#000000"|
|colspan=2 |against all
|
|13.29%
|-
| colspan="5" style="background-color:#E9E9E9;"|
|- style="font-weight:bold"
| colspan="3" style="text-align:left;" | Total
| 
| 100%
|-
| colspan="5" style="background-color:#E9E9E9;"|
|- style="font-weight:bold"
| colspan="4" |Source:
|
|}

1999

|-
! colspan=2 style="background-color:#E9E9E9;text-align:left;vertical-align:top;" |Candidate
! style="background-color:#E9E9E9;text-align:left;vertical-align:top;" |Party
! style="background-color:#E9E9E9;text-align:right;" |Votes
! style="background-color:#E9E9E9;text-align:right;" |%
|-
|style="background-color:"|
|align=left|Nikolay Botka
|align=left|Unity
|
|27.58%
|-
|style="background-color:"|
|align=left|Grigory Naginsky
|align=left|Yabloko
|
|13.28%
|-
|style="background-color:"|
|align=left|Viktor Vorogushin (incumbent)
|align=left|Communist Party
|
|13.14%
|-
|style="background-color:#1042A5"|
|align=left|Zalina Medoeva
|align=left|Union of Right Forces
|
|5.04%
|-
|style="background-color:#3B9EDF"|
|align=left|Nikolay Khaustov
|align=left|Fatherland – All Russia
|
|4.81%
|-
|style="background-color:"|
|align=left|Sergey Marmylev
|align=left|Independent
|
|3.93%
|-
|style="background-color:"|
|align=left|Yury Belyaev
|align=left|Independent
|
|3.30%
|-
|style="background-color:"|
|align=left|Mikhail Glushchenko
|align=left|Independent
|
|2.90%
|-
|style="background-color:"|
|align=left|Aleksey Bondarenko
|align=left|Liberal Democratic Party
|
|2.16%
|-
|style="background-color:#E32322"|
|align=left|Vladimir Leonov
|align=left|Stalin Bloc – For the USSR
|
|1.86%
|-
|style="background-color:"|
|align=left|Lyudmila Pushkareva
|align=left|Independent
|
|1.69%
|-
|style="background-color:"|
|align=left|Vyacheslav Sivko
|align=left|Our Home – Russia
|
|1.40%
|-
|style="background-color:"|
|align=left|Boris Khodykin
|align=left|Independent
|
|1.12%
|-
|style="background-color:#FCCA19"|
|align=left|Leonid Polokhov
|align=left|Congress of Russian Communities-Yury Boldyrev Movement
|
|1.07%
|-
|style="background-color:"|
|align=left|Mikhail Korneev
|align=left|Independent
|
|1.00%
|-
|style="background-color:#E2CA66"|
|align=left|Aleksandr Nadelyuev
|align=left|For Civil Dignity
|
|0.85%
|-
|style="background-color:#004BBC"|
|align=left|Vladimir Osipov
|align=left|Russian Cause
|
|0.74%
|-
|style="background-color:"|
|align=left|Anton Volkov
|align=left|Independent
|
|0.64%
|-
|style="background-color:"|
|align=left|Denis Kravchenko
|align=left|Independent
|
|0.35%
|-
|style="background-color:"|
|align=left|Kirill Ragozin
|align=left|Independent
|
|0.21%
|-
|style="background-color:#000000"|
|colspan=2 |against all
|
|10.93%
|-
| colspan="5" style="background-color:#E9E9E9;"|
|- style="font-weight:bold"
| colspan="3" style="text-align:left;" | Total
| 
| 100%
|-
| colspan="5" style="background-color:#E9E9E9;"|
|- style="font-weight:bold"
| colspan="4" |Source:
|
|}

2003

|-
! colspan=2 style="background-color:#E9E9E9;text-align:left;vertical-align:top;" |Candidate
! style="background-color:#E9E9E9;text-align:left;vertical-align:top;" |Party
! style="background-color:#E9E9E9;text-align:right;" |Votes
! style="background-color:#E9E9E9;text-align:right;" |%
|-
|style="background-color:"|
|align=left|Vitaly Yuzhilin
|align=left|Rodina
|
|34.25%
|-
|style="background-color:"|
|align=left|Igor Dines
|align=left|United Russia
|
|17.29%
|-
|style="background-color:"|
|align=left|Viktor Vorogushin
|align=left|Communist Party
|
|7.90%
|-
|style="background-color:"|
|align=left|Sergey Pavlov
|align=left|Independent
|
|5.65%
|-
|style="background-color:"|
|align=left|Sergey Grachev
|align=left|Yabloko
|
|4.90%
|-
|style="background-color:"|
|align=left|Vsevolod Aziatskov
|align=left|Liberal Democratic Party
|
|3.79%
|-
|style="background-color:"|
|align=left|Boris Bogdanov
|align=left|Independent
|
|2.68%
|-
|style="background-color:#7C73CC"|
|align=left|Aleksandr Argunov
|align=left|Great Russia–Eurasian Union
|
|1.82%
|-
|style="background-color:"|
|align=left|Yury Belyaev
|align=left|Independent
|
|1.69%
|-
|style="background-color:#164C8C"|
|align=left|Roman Stepanov
|align=left|United Russian Party Rus'
|
|1.48%
|-
|style="background-color:"|
|align=left|Yevgeny Antonenko
|align=left|Independent
|
|0.98%
|-
|style="background-color:#000000"|
|colspan=2 |against all
|
|15.75%
|-
| colspan="5" style="background-color:#E9E9E9;"|
|- style="font-weight:bold"
| colspan="3" style="text-align:left;" | Total
| 
| 100%
|-
| colspan="5" style="background-color:#E9E9E9;"|
|- style="font-weight:bold"
| colspan="4" |Source:
|
|}

2016

|-
! colspan=2 style="background-color:#E9E9E9;text-align:left;vertical-align:top;" |Candidate
! style="background-color:#E9E9E9;text-align:left;vertical-align:top;" |Party
! style="background-color:#E9E9E9;text-align:right;" |Votes
! style="background-color:#E9E9E9;text-align:right;" |%
|-
|style="background-color: " |
|align=left|Sergey Naryshkin
|align=left|United Russia
|98,999
|52.49%
|-
|style="background-color: " |
|align=left|Marina Lyubushkina
|align=left|A Just Russia
|22,823
|12.10%
|-
|style="background-color: " |
|align=left|Nikolay Kuzmin
|align=left|Communist Party
|21,424
|11.36%
|-
|style="background-color:" |
|align=left|Vyacheslav Dyubkov
|align=left|Liberal Democratic Party
|14,413
|7.64%
|-
|style="background:"|
|align=left|Viktor Perov
|align=left|Communists of Russia
|6,894
|3.66%
|-
|style="background-color: " |
|align=left|Aleksandr Senotrusov
|align=left|Yabloko
|5,329
|2.83%
|-
|style="background-color: " |
|align=left|Anatoly Golosov
|align=left|Rodina
|3,755
|1.99%
|-
|style="background-color: " |
|align=left|Dmitry Skurikhin
|align=left|People's Freedom Party
|3,194
|1.69%
|-
|style="background:" |
|align=left|Armen Ananyan
|align=left|The Greens
|2,529
|1.34%
|-
|style="background-color: " |
|align=left|Aleksandr Gabitov
|align=left|Civic Platform
|1,541
|0.82%
|-
| colspan="5" style="background-color:#E9E9E9;"|
|- style="font-weight:bold"
| colspan="3" style="text-align:left;" | Total
| 188,602
| 100%
|-
| colspan="5" style="background-color:#E9E9E9;"|
|- style="font-weight:bold"
| colspan="4" |Source:
|
|}

2017

|-
! colspan=2 style="background-color:#E9E9E9;text-align:left;vertical-align:top;" |Candidate
! style="background-color:#E9E9E9;text-align:left;vertical-align:top;" |Party
! style="background-color:#E9E9E9;text-align:right;" |Votes
! style="background-color:#E9E9E9;text-align:right;" |%
|-
|style="background-color: " |
|align=left|Sergey Yakhnyuk
|align=left|United Russia
|61,420
|61.58%
|-
|style="background-color: " |
|align=left|
|align=left|Communist Party
|11,269
|11.30%
|-
|style="background-color: " |
|align=left|Marina Lyubushkina
|align=left|A Just Russia
|6,942
|6.96%
|-
|style="background-color: " |
|align=left|Natalya Kruglova
|align=left|Liberal Democratic Party
|5,198
|5.21%
|-
|style="background:" |
|align=left|Andrey Shirokov
|align=left|Party of Pensioners
|3,714
|3.72%
|-
|style="background-color: " |
|align=left|Sergey Gulyaev
|align=left|Yabloko
|3,138
|3.15%
|-
|style="background: #E62020;"| 
|align=left|Konstantin Zhukov
|align=left|Communists of Russia
|3,040
|3.05%
|-
|style="background-color: " |
|align=left|Valery Shinkarenko
|align=left|Rodina
|1,109
|1.11%
|-
|style="background-color: " |
|align=left|Serik Urazov
|align=left|Patriots of Russia
|758
|0.76%
|-
| colspan="5" style="background-color:#E9E9E9;"|
|- style="font-weight:bold"
| colspan="3" style="text-align:left;" | Total
| 99,745
| 100%
|-
| colspan="5" style="background-color:#E9E9E9;"|
|- style="font-weight:bold"
| colspan="4" |Source:
|
|}

2021

|-
! colspan=2 style="background-color:#E9E9E9;text-align:left;vertical-align:top;" |Candidate
! style="background-color:#E9E9E9;text-align:left;vertical-align:top;" |Party
! style="background-color:#E9E9E9;text-align:right;" |Votes
! style="background-color:#E9E9E9;text-align:right;" |%
|-
|style="background-color: " |
|align=left|Sergey Yakhnyuk (incumbent)
|align=left|United Russia
|72,546
|39.81%
|-
|style="background-color: " |
|align=left|
|align=left|Communist Party
|38,999
|21.40%
|-
|style="background-color: " |
|align=left|Nikita Belousov
|align=left|Liberal Democratic Party
|19,690
|10.81%
|-
|style="background-color: " |
|align=left|Aleksandr Yarov
|align=left|New People
|15,497
|8.50%
|-
|style="background-color: " |
|align=left|Vladislav Golikov
|align=left|Party of Pensioners
|13,773
|7.56%
|-
|style="background-color: " |
|align=left|Igor Pastushenko
|align=left|Rodina
|5,498
|3.02%
|-
|style="background-color: " |
|align=left|Leonid Parunov
|align=left|Civic Platform
|3,628
|1.99%
|-
| colspan="5" style="background-color:#E9E9E9;"|
|- style="font-weight:bold"
| colspan="3" style="text-align:left;" | Total
| 182,221
| 100%
|-
| colspan="5" style="background-color:#E9E9E9;"|
|- style="font-weight:bold"
| colspan="4" |Source:
|
|}

Sources
112. Кингисеппский одномандатный избирательный округ

Notes

References

Russian legislative constituencies
Politics of Leningrad Oblast